Ak-Bulung (or Akbulung) is a village in Naryn District of Naryn Region of Kyrgyzstan. Its population was 343 in 2021.

References
 

 

Populated places in Naryn Region